Vnà is a village in the Lower Engadine in the Swiss canton(or district) of Graubünden, situated at 1,630 m above sea level. It is about 3 km from Ramosch and about 11 km from Scuol, the tourist center of the Lower Engadine.

In addition to several hiking trails into Val Sinestra, Zuort, Samnaun, or Griosch, the small village church and the village museum is worth seeing. The church was renovated from 1963 to 1965. The museum contains more than 400 works by artists and collectors.

Vnà and surroundings photo gallery

References

External links 

Valsot
Villages in Graubünden